Prince George is a census-designated place (CDP) in and the county seat of Prince George County, Virginia, United States. The population as of the 2010 Census was 2,066. It is in the metro area of Richmond, Virginia. The elevation is at 131 feet.

The Prince George County Courthouse Historic District was listed on the National Register of Historic Places in 1970.

Economy

Goya Foods has its Virginia offices just south of the CDP.

Education
Prince George County Public Schools operates public schools.

Prince George High School is in the CDP.

Appomattox Regional Library is the public library system in the area.

References

Unincorporated communities in Virginia
Census-designated places in Prince George County, Virginia
County seats in Virginia
Census-designated places in Virginia